Lua or LUA may refer to:

Science and technology
 Lua (programming language)
 Latvia University of Agriculture
 Last universal ancestor, in evolution

Ethnicity and language
 Lua people, of Laos
 Lawa people, of Thailand sometimes referred to as Lua
 Lua language (disambiguation), several languages (including Lua’)
 Luba-Kasai language, ISO 639 code
 Lai (surname) (賴), Chinese, sometimes romanised as Lua

Places
 Tenzing-Hillary Airport (IATA code), in Lukla, Nepal
 One of the Duff Islands

People
 Lua (goddess), a Roman goddess
 Saint Lua (died c 609)
 Lua Blanco (born 1987), Brazilian actress and singer
 Lua Getsinger (1871–1916)
 A member of Weki Meki band

Other uses
 Lua (martial art), of Hawaii
 "Lua" (song), by Bright Eyes